Pavitra Lokesh is an Indian film and television actress. She appears primarily in Kannada and Telugu films playing supporting roles. The daughter of stage and film actor Mysore Lokesh, she made her film debut at the age of 16 and has since appeared in over 150 Kannada films. At 5 feet 10 inches she was the tallest actress at that time, but managing to do several noteworthy roles even acting against shorter heroes. For her performance in the Kannada film Naayi Neralu (2006), she was awarded the Karnataka State Film Award for Best Actress. and husband Suchendra Prasad are actors.

Personal life
Pavitra was born in Mysore. Her father, Lokesh, was an actor and her mother, a teacher. She has a younger brother, Adi Lokesh. Her father died when Pavitra was in Class nine. Upon securing 80 per cent in her matriculation examination, she aspired to become a civil servant. However, following her father's death, she decided to help her mother who she said was "overburdened with family responsibilities". Initially reluctant to follow her father's footsteps towards a career in acting, she completed her bachelor's degree in commerce from SBRR Mahajana First Grade College, Mysore, and appeared for the Civil Services Examination. After failing to clear the examination in her first attempt, she took to acting before moving to Bangalore.

She got divorced from her first husband who was a Software Engineer. She was later in a live-in-relationship with Suchendra Prasad and separated in 2018. Since 2021, she is in a live-in relationship with Telugu actor, Naresh.

Career

Films
Pavitra took to acting in 1994 on the advice of actor Ambareesh. She made her debut in Mister Abhishek that saw the latter play the lead role. In the same year, she appeared in Bangarada Kalasha. Having not gained recognition from these films, Pavitra completed her graduation and began working for a human resource consulting company. During the time, T. S. Nagabharana offered her a role in his film Janumada Jodi that released in 1996. Speaking about the phase in a 2006 interview with The Hindu, she said, "I never felt comfortable. I felt lonely. But when Nagabharana insisted, I had to take a decision. I resolved to make films my career - no preparation. The only reason to take a plunge was my circumstances. It has been tough to keep it going without a godfather or a guide. So I just accepted every film that came my way." Not being offered lead roles due to her height, she continued playing supporting roles. In the comedy Ulta Palta (1997), she played a vamp.

Pavitra received critical acclaim for her performance in Girish Kasaravalli's period drama Naayi Neralu, a film based on S. L. Bhyrappa's novel of the same name. Impressed by her performance in the television soap Guptagamini, Kasaravalli cast her as a widowed Venkatalakshmi, daughter-in-law and mother of two other characters; the film revolving around these three characters living under one roof, and projecting their own perspectives exposing generation gap in a conflict-ridden society. Her portrayal of a woman caught between tradition and desire won her the Karnataka State Film Award for Best Actress.

Television
In Nagabharana's television soap Jeevanmukhi, she was cast as a middle-aged widow, a role that was received well. She received recognition for her role in the soap Guptagamini that was aired in the early 2000s. "She played a wife, a mother and a sister caught in the web of human emotions". During the time, she also appeared in other soaps such as Gelathi, Neethi Chakra, Dharitri, Punarjanma and Eshwari.

Partial filmography

Kannada

 Mister Abhishek (1995)
 Bangarada Kalasha (1995)
 Janumada Jodi (1996)
 Ulta Palta (1997)
 Tavarina Theru (1997)
 Mavana Magalu (1997)
 Kurubana Rani (1998)
 Jagath Kiladi (1998)
 Yajamana (2000)
 Amma (2001)
 Huchcha (2001)
 Mussanje (2001)
 Namma Samsara Ananda Sagara (2001)
 Shivappa Nayaka (2001)
 Naanu Naane (2002)
 Makeup (2002)
 Border (2003)
 Raja Narasimha (2003)
 Ondagona Baa (2003)
 Bala Shiva (2003)
 Ree Swalpa Bartheera (2003)
 Namma Preethiya Ramu (2003)
 Excuse Me (2003)
 Vijayasimha (2003)
 Swathi Muthu (2003)
 Malla (2004)
 Monda (2004)
 Nija (2004)
 Love (2004)
 Rakshasa (2005)
 Aakash (2005)
 Gowramma (2005)
 Shubham (2006)
 Pandavaru (2006)
 Student (2006)
 Naayi Neralu (2006) as Venkatalakshmi
 Ee Rajeev Gandhi Alla (2007)
 Ee Preethi Onthara (2007)
 Masti (2007)
 Manasugula Mathu Madhura (2008)
 Satya in Love (2008)
 Mr. Garagasa (2008)
 Moggina Jade (2008)
 Mandakini (2008)
 Savaari (2009)
 Hatrick Hodi Maga (2009) as Durgi
 Anishchitha (2010)
 Hoo (2010) as Doctor Pavithra
 Holi (2010)
 Kanasemba Kudureyaneri (2010)
 Kalgejje (2011)
 Hori (2011)
 Dudde Doddappa (2011)
 Aata (2011)
 Bete (2011)
 Prarthane (2012) as Shanti
 Gandhi Smiles (2012)
 Barfi (2013)
 Sneha Yathre (2013)
 Gharshane (2014)
 Rose (2014)
 Bahaddur (2014)
 Neenade Naa (2014)
 Chirayu (2014)
 Endendigu (2015)
 Lodde (2015)
 Dove (2015)
 Ganga (2015) as Ganga's sister
 Naanu Mattu Varalakshmi (2016)
  Kurukshetra (2019)
 Apoorva (2016)
 Dia (2020) - Dr. Lakshmi, Adi's mother
 Pogaru (2021) as Shiva's mother

Telugu

 Dongodu (2003)
 Aalayam (2008 film) (2008)
 Fitting Master (2009) Meghana's mother
 Prasthanam (2010) as Mitra's mother
 Baava (2010) as Veerababu's mother
 Orange (2010) as Jaanu's mother
 Shakti (2011) as Aishwarya's mother
 Gouravam (2013)
 Race Gurram (2014) as Ram and Lucky's mother
 Rough (2014) as Chandu's Mother
 Current Theega (2014) as Parvati
 Lakshmi Raave Maa Intiki (2014)
 Pataas (2015) as Kalyan's mother
 Malli Malli Idi Rani Roju (2015) as Parvati
 Temper (2015) as Lakshmi's mother
 Tungabhadra (2015) as Gowri's mother
 Yevade Subramanyam (2015) as Rishi's mother
 S/O Satyamurthy (2015) as Sharadha Satyamurthy
 Bengal Tiger (2015)
 Pandaga Chesko (2015) as Karthik's mother
 Bruce Lee - The Fighter (2015) as Karthik's mother
 Loafer (2015) as Mouni's mother
 Krishnashtami (2016)
 Dictator (2016) as Rajashekar's wife
 Speedunnodu (2016) as Lakshmi 
 Katamarayudu (2017) as Pavitra
 Duvvada Jagannadham (2017) as DJ's mother
 Jai Lava Kusa (2017) as Jai, Lava, Kusa's mother
 Raja The Great (2017) as Gayatri
 MCA (Middle Class Abbayi) (2017) as Warangal Siva's mother
 Agnyaathavaasi (2018) as Kumari
 Jai Simha (2018) as Vasantha
 Sammohanam (2018) as Vijay's mother
 Pantham (2018) as Durgadevi Surana
 Tej I Love You (2018) as Tej's aunt
 Saakshyam (2018) as Viswa's adopted mother
 Happy Wedding (2018) as Anand's mother
 Mr. Majnu (2019) as Vicky's aunt
 Chitralahari (2019) as Swetcha's mother
 Evaru (2019) as Adarsh Varma's mother
 Sye Raa Narasimha Reddy (2019) as Neelamma
 Choosi Choodangaane (2020) as Siddu's mother
 Entha Manchivaadavuraa (2020) as Gayatri
 Ashwathama (2020) as Gana and Priya's mother
 Red (2021) as Journalist
 Ardha Shathabdham (2021) as Lakshmi
 Dear Megha (2021) as Aadi's mother
 Sarkaru Vaari Paata (2022) as Mahi's mother
 Ante Sundaraniki (2022) as Doctor
 Ramarao on Duty (2022) as Mahalakshmi
  Dhamaka (2022) as Devaki Chakravarthy
  Kalyanam Kamaneeyam (2023) as Shruti’s mother

Tamil

Television
 Jeevanmukhi
 Guptagamini
 Eshwari (2004)
 Swabhimaana
 Pasupu Kumkuma(Zee Telugu)
 Olave Namma Baduku (2007)
 Devi
 Punnaga (2017–)
 Aramane Gili (2019)
11th Hour (2021) as Gayatri Reddy; Aha web series

Awards and nominations

References

External links
 

Living people
Kannada people
Actresses from Mysore
20th-century Indian actresses
21st-century Indian actresses
Indian film actresses
Indian television actresses
Actresses in Kannada cinema
Actresses in Telugu cinema
Date of birth missing (living people)
Actresses in Telugu television
Year of birth missing (living people)